Sebit Bruno (born 16 March 1994) is a South Sudanese footballer who plays as a midfielder. He is the top scorer of the national team with 3 goals, as of 27 March 2016.

International career

International goals
Scores and results list South Sudan's goal tally first.

References

External links 
 

Living people
1994 births
South Sudanese footballers
South Sudan international footballers
Association football midfielders
People from Juba